The popularly named "Tomb of the Julii" (Mausoleum "M") survives in the Vatican Necropolis beneath St. Peter's Basilica. The serendipitous discovery near the crypt has a vaulted ceiling bearing a mosaic depicting Helios (Roman Sol Invictus) with an aureole riding in his chariot, within a framing of rinceaux of vine leaves. The mosaic is dated to the late 3rd century to early 4th century.  Other mosaics in this tomb depicting Jonah and the whale, the good shepherd carrying a lamb (the kriophoros motif), and fishermen have encouraged its interpretation as a Christian tomb.

This tomb was first discovered in 1574 AD when workmen accidentally broke through the ceiling while conducting some floor alterations in the basilica. The inside was briefly explored and documented before the opening was sealed over once more.

See also
 St. Peter's Basilica
 Index of Vatican City-related articles

References
 Beckwith, John 1979. Early Christian and Byzantine Art (Yale University Press): 19
 Perler, Othmar 1953, Die Mosaiken der Juliergruft im Vatikan (Universitätsverlag): 34–36
 Walsh, John Evangelist. The Bones of Saint Peter (The Chaucer Press): 15

Specific

Further reading
 Weitzmann, Kurt, ed., Age of spirituality: late antique and early Christian art, third to seventh century, no. 467, 1979, Metropolitan Museum of Art, New York, 

Cemeteries in Vatican City
Tourist attractions in Rome
Early Christian art
Roman mosaics
Horses in art